The Wabash Alloys Locomotive is a GE 25-ton diesel-electric locomotive built in 1940–43. Little is known about its early life, but from around 1970, it worked at Wabash Alloys, a producer of aluminum alloys, at  Haskell, Arkansas.

It eventually became surplus to the company's needs and they donated it to the Arkansas Railroad Museum at Pine Bluff, Arkansas on March 8, 2003.

The 25-ton model was the smallest locomotive in the GE range in the 1940s and 50s. It was designed for the small industrial user. Although the Arkansas nomination document asserts that "large Class I railroads would have used them for switching on light branch lines," standard freight cars of the time were up to 70 tons (64t) gross weight, or 17.5 tons (16t) per axle, so there was little need for 12.5 ton (11t) per axle locomotives on railroads, even on light branch lines, but GE built hundreds of them for industrial users.

It was added to the National Register of Historic Places in 2007.

References

Arkansas Railroad Museum
B locomotives
Diesel-electric locomotives of the United States
General Electric locomotives
National Register of Historic Places in Pine Bluff, Arkansas
Railway locomotives introduced in 1940
Railway locomotives on the National Register of Historic Places in Arkansas
Standard gauge locomotives of the United States